Alugha with headquarters in Mannheim, Germany is Germany's only open video portal and the first multilingual  cloud-based video hosting platform on which online videos can be converted into multilingual formats.

History 
Alugha GmbH was founded in 2014 by the families of Bernd Korz and the chairman of the supervisory board of Duravit and shareholder of the Röchling Group, Gregor Greinert. The beginnings of Alugha (Arabic "A" and Swahili "lugha") go back to the year 2012. At that time, Korz had a YouTube channel on which he published tutorial videos on how to remodel a farmhouse and later videos on computer topics. As the demand for multilingual videos increased, Korz decided to use subtitles, as no video portal offered the option to change the language while watching the video. But this solution was not optimal and he came up with the idea to implement the option to change the language while the video is playing. Since the development of a prototype would have cost 800,000 euros, Korz's then 15-year-old son Niklas developed the prototype. In March 2015, Alugha released the first version of the platform.

Awards 
 Innovation Hub Tata Communications, Winner 2020

External links 
 Website Alugha

References 

Computer companies established in 2014
Companies based in Mannheim
Video hosting
German companies established in 2014